Godeanu is a commune located in Mehedinți County, Oltenia, Romania. It is composed of four villages: Godeanu, Marga, Păunești and Șiroca.

References

Communes in Mehedinți County
Localities in Oltenia